Wendy Priesnitz is a Canadian alternative education and environmental advocate. She was leader of the Green Party of Canada from July 1996 to January 1997, when she abruptly resigned.

She is known for her advocacy of homeschooling/unschooling and home-based/green business. The practice of unschooling encourages students to use their curiosity to learn. As Priesnitz describes it: "[unschooling] children generally live and learn, with the support of their families, based on their own interests and their timetables, and without curriculum, tests, or grades." 

She founded the Canadian Alliance of Home Schoolers in 1979 and is the author of numerous books on homeschooling. Since 1976, she has co-owned and edited Natural Life (magazine), an award-winning sustainable lifestyles magazine. In 2002, she founded Life Learning Magazine, which she owns and edits. She is listed in Canadian Who's Who and Who's Who of Canadian Women.

Works

References

External links
Biography of Wendy Priesnitz
Life Media

Green Party of Canada leaders
Female Canadian political party leaders
Canadian women in federal politics
Canadian women non-fiction writers
Homeschooling advocates
Living people
Advocates of unschooling and homeschooling
Year of birth missing (living people)